Liberty Municipal Airport  is a public use airport in Liberty County, Texas, United States. It is owned by the  City of Liberty and is located six nautical miles (11 km) northeast of its central business district.

Facilities and aircraft
It has one runway designated 16/34 with an asphalt surface measuring 3,801 by 75 feet (1,159 x 23 m).

For the 12-month period ending September 20, 2007, the airport had 5,725 aircraft operations, an average of 15 per day: 99.6% general aviation and 0.4% military. At that time there were 14 aircraft based at this airport: 86% single-engine and 14% ultralight.

References

External links
 Liberty Municipal Airport page at City of Liberty website
 
 

Airports in Greater Houston
Buildings and structures in Liberty County, Texas
Transportation in Liberty County, Texas